American Vampire (also known as An American Vampire Story) is a 1997 American independent comedy horror film directed by Luis Esteban, written by Rollin Jarrett, and starring Carmen Electra, Adam West, Sidney Lassick and Trevor Lissauer. Its plot is about a young male teenager who encounters a female vampire while his parents vacation in Europe.

Plot
Teenager Frankie (Trevor Lissauer), is left in charge of the family home for a few weeks while his parents are vacationing in Europe. After a day of surfing on the beach, Frankie and his best friend Bogie (Danny Hitt) happen upon a group of sexy Bohemian vampires led by Moondoggie (Johnny Venocur) along with his minions Sulka and Katrina (Carmen Electra and Deborah Xavier) and invite them to stay in Frankie's house for a few days in hopes of getting lucky. When Frankie learns that the threesome have some secrets, he enlists the aid of the Big Kahuna, a legendary vampire killer (Adam West) who teaches Frankie how to solve his vampire problems. 

The film attained cult-like status with its tongue in cheek humor and its many references to the Beach Party films of Frankie Avalon and Annette Funicello, which were hugely popular in the mid-1960s. An appearance by iconic surf guitar legend Dick Dale performing on the beach adds to the retro vibe of the film.

Cast
 Trevor Lissauer as Frankie
 Daisy Torme as Dee Dee
 Johnny Venocur as Moondoggie (alias Count Erik Von Zipper)
 Sydney Lassick as Bruno
 Carmen Electra as Sulka
 Debra Xavier as Katrina
 Adam West as Ludwig Von Helsingmeister (alias The Big Kahuna)
 Danny Hitt as Bogie
 Dick Dale as himself

Home media
The film was released on VHS and DVD on March 20, 2001 by York Home Entertainment. An audio track featuring commentary from comedians from Los Angeles's Groundlings troupe was included. This release featured over-dubbed audio tracks on the actors' performances. It was re-released in 2005 by Digiview Productions in a slim-case package.

References

External links
 
 
 American Vampire Story at The New York Times

1997 films
1997 horror films
1990s comedy horror films
American comedy horror films
American independent films
1997 comedy films
1990s English-language films
1990s American films